The Mel languages are a branch of Niger–Congo languages spoken in Guinea-Bissau, Guinea, Sierra Leone, and Liberia. The most populous is Temne, with about two million speakers; Kissi is next, with half a million.

Languages
Mel has traditionally been classified as the bulk of a southern branch of a West Atlantic branch of Niger–Congo. However, these are geographic and typological rather than genealogical groups; Segerer (2010) shows that there is no exclusive relationship between Mel and the other southern languages, Sua (Mansoanka) and Gola.

Fields (2004) splits Mel into a Highlands group originating in Guinea, and also a Bullom-Kisi-Gola group.

Mel
Bullom-Kisi-Gola
Gola
Bullom-Kisi
Bullom
Kisi
Highlands	
Temne
Landuma
Sitem

Fields (2008:83) proposes that the homeland of Proto-Mel is located in the north-central highlands of Sierra Leone just to the south of the Lesser Scarcies River, rather than on the coast. The homeland of Proto-Highlands is located along the middle stretches of the Konkoure River in Guinea, just to the northeast of Conakry (Fields 2008:85).

Comparative vocabulary
Comparison of basic vocabulary words in the Mel languages from Fields (2004):

Comparison of basic vocabulary words in the Mel languages, and also Sua and Gola, from Wilson (2007): Limba has also been added from Clarke (1922).

See also
Rio Nunez languages

References

 
Atlantic languages